William Kirk Baltz (born September 14, 1959) is an American actor. He is best known for his role as the police officer Marvin Nash in Quentin Tarantino's film Reservoir Dogs.

Life and career
Baltz was born in New York City, New York. He played Officer Marvin Nash, an officer in the Los Angeles Police Department, in the 1992 Quentin Tarantino film Reservoir Dogs. Baltz also starred in another film written by Tarantino, 1994's Natural Born Killers, as Roger. His other film credits include the 1990 drama film Dances With Wolves, the 1997 action film Face/Off and the 1998 political satire Bulworth. Baltz starred in Paul Thomas Anderson's directorial debut in the 1993 short film Cigarettes & Coffee.

Baltz has appeared in many made-for-television films, and starred in the 1999 miniseries To Serve and Protect. He starred in the short-lived 1992 television series Human Target, and played sinister stalker Steve Roth in The Marla Hanson Story (1991).

He has made guest appearances on shows including Will and Grace, NYPD Blue, Seven Days, The Shield, 24, and Without a Trace. Baltz was the first actor to portray the Batman villain Clayface in live-action, in the short-lived series Birds of Prey.

Baltz operates an acting school in Los Angeles, California; one of Baltz's students was professional wrestler Chris Jericho.

Filmography

Film

Television

Video games

References

External links
 
 
 Acting Coach in Los Angeles

1959 births
Male actors from New York City
American male film actors
American male television actors
Living people